The 2001 UAE President's Cup Final was the 25th final of the Emirati competition, the UAE President's Cup. The final was played at Zayed Sports City, in Abu Dhabi, on 7 June 2001. Al Ain beat Al Shaab 3–2 to win their second title.

Match details

References

2001
Cup
Al Ain FC matches
Al-Shaab CSC matches